Richard Barry, 7th Earl of Barrymore (14 August 1769 – 6 March 1793) was an English nobleman of Irish heritage, as well as an infamous rake, gambler, sportsman, theatrical enthusiast and womanizer.

He was known as Hellgate and the Rake of Rakes and died at the age of 23.

Family
Barrymore was born on 14 August 1769 in Marylebone, Middlesex, to Richard Barry, 6th Earl of Barrymore and Lady Amelia Stanhope, daughter of William Stanhope, 2nd Earl of Harrington and the Lady Caroline Fitzroy. He succeeded his father as Earl on 1 August 1773. His mother placed him under the care of the vicar of Wargrave in Berkshire, where he spent his pre-public school childhood and later settled.

He was educated at Eton College and arrived with an unusually large sum of £1,000 to his free will. Soon he regularly summoned a London cab driver who would take him to London several times a week to satisfy his sexual appetite with a variety of 'ladies of the night'. He was a daring prankster, an attribute which was greatly attractive to the mischievous and impressionable future George IV. One of his most favoured practical jokes would involve pretending to kidnap girls from the streets of London and place coffins outside of their houses with a view to terrifying their servants. His infamy as a gambler was considerable at the time, including his wager that he could consume a large live tomcat in one sitting; however, he did not do so.

He was heavily in debt before marrying, but instead of "marrying into money" as was common for nobility at the time, he married Charlotte Goulding, niece of the infamous Letty Lade, and the daughter of a sedan chair man on 7 June 1792. After his death the next year, when she was eighteen years old, she remarried to Captain Robert Williams of the 3rd Foot Guards, but she eventually "...passed...to the lowest grade of prostitution...and possessed great pugilistic skill". However, she proved a useful and trustworthy assistant as matron of the female prisoners at the Tothill Fields Bridewell.

His sister Caroline (1768–?) was known as "Billingsgate", due to her use of foul language. Henry (1770–1823), his younger brother, was "Cripplegate", due to a physical disfigurement. His youngest brother Augustus (1773–1818) was nicknamed "Newgate", after Newgate Prison in London.

Sport
Barrymore became a well-known sportsman, particularly in cricket, running, horse-racing, boxing and swordsmanship. He bred his own racehorses and rode as his own jockey. He was especially famous for placing huge bets on both these sports and other extraordinarily ludicrous challenges.

He patronised his own personal bare-knuckle boxer, and his wife also boxed.

He made two known appearances in first-class cricket matches from 1791 to 1792, playing as a member of the Brighton Cricket Club. He was listed in the scorecards as Lord Barrymore.

Theatre
He attended regularly the theatre, and had built, acted at and ran a costly theatre in Wargrave before his early death.

Politics
He expended money to be one of the two MPs for Heytesbury from 1791, able to contribute to the national debate until his death.

Military career and early death
Barrymore retired to life in the Berkshire Militia, into which he had been commissioned in 1789 and was later promoted Captain, but was accidentally killed at Folkestone on 6 March 1793. When driving a gig his musket discharged while escorting French prisoners of war to Dover.

He was buried on 17 May 1793 in St Mary's Church in Wargrave.

Aftermath

Barrymore family estate
Lord Barrymore died in perhaps unexpected solvency, with no legitimate son. He had alienated much of his Cork patrimony in 1792, at which time the Buttevant estate passed to Viscount Doneraile and to a Scottish banker, John Anderson.

Literary references
In the 20th century historic novel Regency Buck by Georgette Heyer, a character remarks tolerantly that "the Barrymores, you know, really cannot be held accountable for their odd manners".

Notes and references
Notes 
  
References

External links
 Royal Berkshire History: Richard Barry, Earl of Barrymore
 

1769 births
1793 deaths
People educated at Eton College
Firearm accident victims
Royal Berkshire Militia officers
British racehorse owners and breeders
English gamblers
English jockeys
English male stage actors
English theatre directors
English theatre managers and producers
History of boxing
People from Marylebone
People from Wargrave
Members of the Parliament of Great Britain for English constituencies
British MPs 1790–1796
English cricketers
English cricketers of 1787 to 1825
Brighton cricketers
Deaths by firearm in England
Accidental deaths in England
Richard
Earls of Barrymore